The Coalgate School Gymnasium-Auditorium is a historic school building in Coalgate, Oklahoma. It is located at the intersection of Fox and Frey streets in Coalgate, Oklahoma and is one of several properties in Southeastern Oklahoma constructed by the Works Progress Administration during the Great Depression. It is listed on the National Register of Historic Places.

The gymnasium-auditorium was built by unemployed coal miners who lived in the Coalgate area. The building is significant because it provided needed employment to residents, and the completed building was a center for school and community events. These activities, particularly basketball games, encouraged a feeling of community identity and pride. It is one of three WPA-built structures still standing in Coal County, Oklahoma.

Architecture
The building is a single story rectangular structure built of sandstone from the area. It measures . Entrances to the building are surrounded by arches and parapets. It has a gabled roof with shingles that are replacements for the original roofing material.

References

School buildings on the National Register of Historic Places in Oklahoma
Coal County, Oklahoma
Works Progress Administration in Oklahoma
National Register of Historic Places in Coal County, Oklahoma
School buildings completed in 1936